The Princess Bride is the fourth soundtrack album by British singer-songwriter and guitarist Mark Knopfler, released on 12 November 1987 by Vertigo Records internationally, and by Warner Bros. Records in the United States. The album contains music composed for the 1987 film The Princess Bride, directed by Rob Reiner. The album features the song "Storybook Love", written and performed by Willy DeVille and arranged by Mark Knopfler. In 1988, the song received an Academy Award nomination for Best Original Song.

Background
In his audio commentary of the film on the Special Edition DVD, director Rob Reiner said that only Mark Knopfler of Dire Straits could create a soundtrack to capture the film's quirky yet romantic nature. Reiner was an admirer of Knopfler's work but did not know him before working on the film. He sent the script to him hoping he would agree to score the film. Knopfler agreed on one condition: that somewhere in the film Reiner would include the  baseball cap (modified to say USS Ooral Sea) he wore as Marty DiBergi in the film This is Spinal Tap. Reiner was unable to produce the original cap, but did include a similar cap in the grandson's room. Later Knopfler said he was only joking about the hat.

Critical reception

In his review for AllMusic, Johnny Loftus gave the album four and a half out of five stars, praising Knopfler's ability to capture the varied dramatic elements of the film in the music.

The editorial reviewer on Filmtracks gave the album four out of five stars, calling it "an important piece of late-80's film music history."

In 1988, the song "Storybook Love", written by Willy DeVille and arranged by Mark Knopfler, received an Academy Award nomination for Best Original Song.

Track listing
All music was written by Mark Knopfler, except where indicated.

Charts

Personnel
Music
 Mark Knopfler – guitars
 Guy Fletcher – keyboards
 Willy DeVille – vocals

Production
 Mark Knopfler – producer
 Bill Schnee – mixing
 Marc De Sisto – engineer
 Bob Ludwig – mastering
 Steve Jackson – engineer, mixing ("Storybook Love")
 Deborah Feingold – photography

References

External links
 The Princess Bride at Mark Knopfler official website
 

1987 soundtrack albums
Film scores
Soundtrack
Mark Knopfler soundtracks
Warner Records soundtracks
1980s film soundtrack albums